Pătrașcu is a Romanian-language surname that may refer to:

Bogdan Pătrașcu, Romanian footballer
Cerasela Pătraşcu, Romanian artistic gymnast
Florin Pătrașcu, Romanian footballer
Maria Patrascu, Romanian-born Canadian tennis player
Mihai Pătraşcu, Romanian-American computer scientist
Pătrașcu cel Bun

Romanian-language surnames